Duke Ping of Qi (died 456 BC) was from 480 to 456 BC the titular ruler of the State of Qi, a major power during the Spring and Autumn period of ancient China.  His personal name was Lü Ao (呂驁), ancestral name Jiang (姜), and Duke Ping was his posthumous title.

Reign
Duke Ping was a younger son of Duke Dao of Qi, who was killed in 485 BC after four years of reign, probably by Tian Heng, leader of the powerful Tian clan.  Subsequently Duke Ping's older brother Duke Jian ascended the throne.  In 481 BC, Tian Heng staged a preemptive coup d'etat and killed Duke Jian and his prime minister Kan Zhi, who had been plotting to attack and expel the Tian clan.

Tian Heng became the de facto ruler of Qi, but he installed Duke Ping on the throne as the figurehead ruler.  Duke Ping ruled for 25 years and died in 456 BC.  He was succeeded by his son Duke Xuan of Qi.

Family
Sons:
 Prince Ji (d. 405 BC), ruled as Duke Xuan of Qi from 455–405 BC

Ancestry

References

Year of birth unknown
Monarchs of Qi (state)
5th-century BC Chinese monarchs
456 BC deaths